The Town and Country Planning (General Permitted Development) (England) Order 2015 (the "GPDO 2015") is a statutory instrument, applying in England, that grants planning permission for certain types of development (such development is then referred to as permitted development). Schedule 2 of the GPDO 2015 specifies the classes of development for which planning permission is granted, and specifies the exceptions, limitations, and conditions that apply to some of these classes. The GPDO 2015 was made by the Secretary of State under authority granted by sections 59, 60, and 333 of the Town and Country Planning Act 1990.

History

The GPDO 2015 came into force on 15 April 2015, and was introduced by Statutory Instrument 2015 No. 596. The GPDO 2015 revoked The Town and Country Planning (General Permitted Development) Order 1995 (the "GPDO 1995"), which was the previous version of the legislation.

Since it came into force, the GPDO 2015 has been amended by a number of subsequent statutory instruments, including SI 2016 No. 332, SI 2016 No. 1040, SI 2017 No. 391, SI 2017 No. 619, SI 2018 No. 343, SI 2019 No. 907, SI 2020 No. 330, SI 2020 No. 412, and SI 2020 No. 632.

The website www.legislation.gov.uk, which is delivered by the National Archives, provides the original ("as made") version of the GPDO 2015, but states that UK statutory instruments are not carried in their "revised" form on the website.

The previous version of the legislation, the GPDO 1995, came into force on 3 June 1995, and was introduced by Statutory Instrument 1995 No. 418. During the time it was in force (i.e. from 3 June 1995 until 14 April 2015), the GPDO 1995 was amended by a number of subsequent statutory instruments. With respect to England, the Planning Jungle website states that the GPDO 1995 was amended by a total of 37 subsequent statutory instruments.

The following list shows all of the versions of the GPDO from 1948 to present:
 The Town and Country Planning General Development Order 1948.
 The Town and Country Planning General Development Order 1959.
 The Town and Country Planning General Development Order 1963.
 The Town and Country Planning General Development Order 1973.
 The Town and Country Planning General Development Order 1977.
 The Town and Country Planning General Development Order 1988.
 The Town and Country Planning (General Permitted Development) Order 1995.
 The Town and Country Planning (General Permitted Development) (England) Order 2015.

Operation of the GPDO 2015

Article 1 sets out that the GPDO 2015 applies to all land in England, with exceptions where the land is the subject of a special development order.
Article 2 defines various terms within the GPDO 2015.
Article 3 sets out that the GPDO 2015 grants planning permission for the classes of development in Schedule 2 (referred to as "permitted development"), subject to any relevant exception, limitation or condition specified in Schedule 2. Article 3 also sets out a number of exceptions, including that the GPDO 2015 does not permit development contrary to any condition imposed by any planning permission, and that the GPDO 2015 does not grant permission where the existing building or use is unlawful.
Article 4 sets out that the Secretary of State or the local planning authority may make a direction (referred to as an Article 4 direction) restricting certain permitted development rights. Schedule 3 sets out the procedure for introducing Article 4 directions.
Schedule 1 Part 1 defines "article 2(3) land", which includes land which is a national park, an Area of Outstanding Natural Beauty, a conservation area, The Broads, or a World Heritage Site.
 Schedule 1 Part 3, which was deleted with effect from 31 May 2019, defined "article 2(5) land", which consisted of designated areas within a total of 17 different local authorities.
Schedule 2 specifies the classes of development to which article 3 refers (i.e. for which planning permission is granted). These classes are contained within 21 "Parts" (i.e. Parts 1 to 20, including Part 12A).

Schedule 2 of the GPDO 2015

Schedule 2 specifies the classes of development for which planning permission is granted, and specifies the exceptions, limitations, and conditions that apply to some of these classes. These classes are contained within the following 20 "Parts":

Part 1: Development within the curtilage of a dwellinghouse.
Part 2: Minor operations.
Part 3: Changes of use.
Part 4: Temporary buildings and uses.
Part 5: Caravan sites and recreational campsites.
Part 6: Agricultural and forestry.
Part 7: Non-domestic extensions, alterations etc.
Part 8: Transport-related development.
Part 9: Development relating to roads.
Part 10: Repairs to services.
Part 11: Heritage and demolition.
Part 12: Development by local authorities.
Part 12A: Development by Local Authorities and Health Service Bodies
Part 13: Water and sewerage.
Part 14: Renewable energy.
Part 15: Power related development.
Part 16: Communications.
Part 17: Mining and mineral exploration.
Part 18: Miscellaneous development.
Part 19: Development by the Crown or for national security purposes.
Part 20: Construction of New Dwellinghouses

Householder permitted development

The phrase "permitted development" is often used to refer to Schedule 2 Part 1, which relates to "Development within the curtilage of a dwellinghouse".

Householder permitted development in England

With respect to England, householder permitted development is set out by Schedule 2 Part 1 of the GPDO 2015, as introduced on 15 April 2015 by SI 2015 No. 596, then amended on 6 April 2016 by SI 2016 No. 332, then amended on 6 April 2017 by SI 2017 No. 391, then amended on 1 June 2018 by SI 2018 No. 119, then amended on 25 May 2019 by SI 2019 No. 907, and then amended on 1 August 2020 by SI 2020 No. 632

In September 2008, the Department for Communities and Local Government ("DCLG") published a document titled Guidance on the permeable surfacing of front gardens, which provides advice about how to interpret Part 1 Class F. This document was subsequently updated in May 2009.

In August 2010, DCLG published a document titled Permitted development rights for householders: technical guidance, which provides advice about how to interpret Part 1. This document was subsequently updated in January 2013, October 2013, April 2014, April 2016, April 2017, and September 2019.

In May 2013, DCLG published a document titled "Home Extensions - Neighbour Consultation Scheme", which provided advice about the system of larger rear extensions under Part 1 Class A. This document was subsequently updated in June 2013 and June 2015. In March 2016, this document was replaced by a document published by the Planning Portal (see below).

In May 2014, DCLG published the "Planning practice guidance", which includes a section titled "What are permitted development rights?". This website is updated on an ongoing basis.

In March 2016, the Planning Portal published a document titled "Notification of a proposed larger Home Extension", which provides advice about the system of larger rear extensions under Part 1 Class A. This document was subsequently updated in May 2019, August 2019, and November 2019. The current version of this document is titled Application to determine if prior approval is required for a proposed: Larger Home Extension.

In the above "Permitted development rights for householders: technical guidance" document, the 8 classes of Schedule 2 Part 1 are described as follows:

Class A covers the enlargement, improvement or alterations to a house such as rear or side extensions as well as general alterations such as new windows and doors. From 30 May 2013 to 30 May 2019 a neighbour consultation scheme for larger rear extensions under Class A is required.
Class B covers additions or alterations to roofs which enlarge the house such as loft conversions involving dormer windows.
Class C covers other alterations to roofs such as re-roofing or the installation of roof lights/windows.
Class D covers the erection of a porch outside an external door.
Class E covers the provision of buildings and other development within the curtilage of the house.
Class F covers the provision of hard surfaces within the curtilage of the house such as driveways.
Class G covers the installation, alteration, or replacement of a chimney, flue or soil and vent pipe.
Class H covers the installation, alteration, or replacement of microwave antenna such as satellite dishes.

For the above legislation, public consultations were undertaken from 21 May 2007 to 17 August 2007, from 12 November 2012 to 24 December 2012, from 31 July 2014 to 26 September 2014, and from 29 October 2018 to 14 January 2019.

Prior approval
Some changes of use are subject to a prior approval procedure with the local planning authority (LPA). This seeks approval of various matters, dependent on the nature of the use, but might typically include matters relating to transport and highways impacts, contamination risks, and flooding risks. For example, in the case of a change of use to A3 (restaurant and cafes) under Part 3 Class C, the developer needs to apply to the LPA with respect to transport and highways impacts, noise impacts, odour impacts, the impacts of storage and handling of waste, the impacts of the hours of opening, the impacts on adequate provision of services and (if applicable) the sustainability of a key shopping area, and (in the case of building or other operations) siting, design or external appearance.

Permitted development rights currently exist for the change of use of premises from B1(a) (offices) to C3 (dwellinghouses). This is subject to prior approval with respect to transport and highways impacts, contamination risks, flooding risks, and the impacts of noise from commercial premises on the intended occupiers of the development. For development that's assessed against the pre-06/04/2016 version of this class, the use of the building within C3 must begin on or before 30 May 2016, (see Schedule 2, Part 3, Class O) whereas for development that's assessed against the 06/04/2016 version of this Class the development must be completed within 3 years starting with the prior approval date. (see article 7) Some local authorities have removed permitted development rights from areas within their boroughs via an article 4 directions.

Householder permitted development in Wales

With respect to Wales, householder permitted development is set out by Schedule 2 Part 1 of the GPDO 1995, as amended on 30 September 2013 by Statutory Instrument 2013 No. 1776.

In July 2013, the Welsh Government published a document titled "Technical Guidance: Permitted development for householders", which provides advice about how to interpret Part 1. This document was subsequently updated in April 2014.

For the above legislation, a public consultation was undertaken from 23 November 2010 to 15 February 2011.

Amendments since 2013
With respect to England, Schedule 2 Parts 1, 2, 3, 4, 7, and 16 were amended on 30 May 2013 by SI 2013 No. 1101, Part 16 was amended on 21 August 2013 by SI 2013 No. 1868, Part 11 was amended on 1 October 2013 by SI 2013 No. 2147 and by SI 2013 No. 2435, Parts 1, 2, 3, 6, and 7 were amended on 6 April 2014 by SI 2014 No. 564, Parts 3, 4, and 11 were amended on 6 April 2015 by SI 2015 No. 659, all Parts were amended on 15 April 2015 by SI 2015 No. 596, Parts 1, 3, 4, and 17 were amended on 6 April 2016 by SI 2016 No. 332, Part 16 was amended on 24 November 2016 by SI 2016 No. 1040, Parts 1, 4, 7, 14, and 15 were amended on 6 April 2017 by SI 2017 No. 391, Parts 3, 4, and 11 were amended on 23 May 2017 by SI 2017 No. 619, Parts 3, 6, 9, and 16 were amended on 6 April 2018 by SI 2018 No. 343, Parts 1, 2, 3, 4, 7, and 16 were amended on 25 May 2019 by SI 2019 No. 907, Part 4 was amended on 24 March 2020 by SI 2020 No. 330, Part 12A was introduced on 9 April 2020 by SI 2020 No. 412, and Parts 3, 4, 12 were amended and Part 20 was introduced on 25 June 2020 and 1 August 2020 by SI 2020 No. 632.

For the above changes, public consultations were undertaken from 8 April 2011 to 30 June 2011, from 3 July 2012 to 11 September 2012, from 12 November 2012 to 24 December 2012, from 3 May 2013 to 14 June 2013, from 6 August 2013 to 15 October 2013, from 31 July 2014 to 26 September 2014, from 5 March 2015 to 16 April 2015, from 13 August 2015 to 24 September 2015, and from 18 February 2016 to 15 April 2016, and from 29 October 2018 to 14 January 2019.

On 25 May 2019 Housing Minister Kit Malthouse MP announced that temporary changes to Permitted Development Rights, in place since 2012 and due to expire on 30 May 2019, would become permanent. In effect the new legislation means home owners can build up to 8 metres projection from the rear wall if building on a detached property (rather than the previous 4 metres) and 6 metres if attached (rather than the previous 3 metres) as Permitted Development. The height restrictions remain at 3 metres height to eaves and 4 metres overall height.

Part 3 Class O excluded areas
Some local planning authorities resisted the office-to-residential rights and so these rights do not apply to certain areas within:
Greater London: Camden, City of London, Hackney, Islington, Kensington and Chelsea, Lambeth, Newham, Southwark, Tower Hamlets, Wandsworth, Westminster
Outside Greater London: Ashford, East Hampshire, Manchester, Sevenoaks, Stevenage, Vale of White Horse

Coronavirus
In response to the COVID-19 pandemic, restaurants, cafes and pubs are allowed to provide takeaway food without specific planning permission.

See also
Town and country planning in the United Kingdom

References

External links
Statutory Instrument 2015 No. 596 - Original (As made)
The Planning Portal website - Do you need permission?
The Planning Jungle website - Part 1 of the GPDO - Visual Guide
The Planning Jungle website - GPDO 1995 (Consolidated) (Superseded)
Planning Geek Website - GPDO in simple terms

Housing in the United Kingdom
United Kingdom planning law
1995 in British law
Statutory Instruments of the United Kingdom